Unity Braxton Middle School is a middle school in Prince William County, Virginia. It is named for local black community figures Celestine and Carroll Braxton.

Formerly named Stonewall Middle School after the Confederate general Stonewall Jackson, it was renamed to Unity Braxton Middle School in 2020, during the George Floyd protests.

See also 
 Unity Reed High School

References

External links 
 

Schools in Prince William County, Virginia
Name changes due to the George Floyd protests